The Bilsam Sky Walker II is a Polish powered parachute designed and produced by Bilsam Aviation of Poznań. The aircraft is supplied as a complete ready-to-fly-aircraft.

The manufacturer's website is non-functional and has been so since about 2008, so it is not clear if the company is still in business.

Design and development
It features a  parachute-style wing, two-seats-in-side-by-side configuration, tricycle landing gear and a single  Bilsam TNA 625 four stroke engine in pusher configuration.

The aircraft carriage is built from a combination of composite material and steel tubing. In flight steering is accomplished via foot pedals that actuate the canopy brakes, creating roll and yaw. Unusually for this class of aircraft, the Sky Walker II has an enclosed cockpit. A variety of wings can be fitted.

Specifications (Sky Walker II)

References

External links

Sky Walker II
2000s Polish sport aircraft
2000s Polish ultralight aircraft
Single-engined pusher aircraft
Powered parachutes